Vitória Ferreira Silva (born 23 January 2002), known as Vitória Yaya or just Yaya, is a Brazilian professional footballer who plays as a midfielder for Santos.

Club career

Early career
Born in Suzano but raised in Ferraz de Vasconcelos, both in the São Paulo state, Yaya joined Centro Olímpico's youth setup at the age of 13; due to her style of play being similar to Yaya Touré, she earned that nickname. In 2017, she moved to São Paulo, after the club established a partnership with Centro Olímpico.

São Paulo
Promoted to the first team for the 2019 season, Yaya made her senior debut on 27 March 2019, starting and scoring the winner in a 1–0 Série A2 home success over América Mineiro. She was a regular starter during the club's league campaign, as they achieved promotion to the Série A1 as champions.

Santos
On 8 January 2023, Yaya was announced at Santos.

International career
Yaya represented Brazil at under-17 level in 2018 South American U-17 Women's Championship and 2018 FIFA U-17 Women's World Cup. On 20 August 2019, aged 17, she received her first call-up for the full side, for the year's International Women's Football Tournament; she remained an unused substitute in Brazil's two matches in the competition.

After playing for the under-20 team in the 2020 and 2022 editions of the South American Under-20 Women's Football Championship, Yaya made her full international debut on 10 October 2022, replacing Ary Borges late into a 1–0 friendly win over Italy at the Stadio Luigi Ferraris in Genoa.

Career statistics

International

Honours

Club
São Paulo
Campeonato Brasileiro de Futebol Feminino Série A2: 2019

International
Brazil U17
South American Under-17 Women's Football Championship: 2018

Brazil U20
South American Under-20 Women's Football Championship: 2022

References

2002 births
Living people
Footballers from São Paulo (state)
Brazilian women's footballers
Women's association football midfielders
Campeonato Brasileiro de Futebol Feminino Série A1 players
São Paulo FC (women) players
Santos FC (women) players
Brazil women's international footballers
People from Suzano
People from Ferraz de Vasconcelos